The Imphal West district of Manipur state in India has four sub-divisions. As of 2023, it has 4 municipal councils or municipal corporations, and 178 villages. The 2011 Census of India recorded 16 towns (including 3 municipal councils) and 124 villages in the district.

Blocks 

The district has the following subdivisions:

Towns 

The district has following towns:

Villages 

The district has following villages:

Lamphel sub-division (Central SDC Circle) 

The following villages are not listed in the 2011 census directory:

 Chingamkham Leikai
 Ploice Bazar
 Chingamathak
 Chingamakha
 Ningthoujam Leikai
 Keishamthong
 Babupara
 Khagempalli
 Naoriya Pakhanglakpa
 Singjamei
 Oinam Thingel
 Sagolband
 Bijoygovinda
 Uripok
 Khwai Bazar
 Lalambung
 Kangla
 Khwai Lalambung
 Thangmeiband
 Kabo Leikai
 Meitei Langol
 Lamphel Pat
 Iroisemba
 Takyel Khongbal

Lamsang subdivision

Lamsang SDC Circle 

The following villages are not listed in the 2011 census directory:

 Akham
 Laingamkhul
 Kangchup
 Taothong
 Lamdeng
 Lamdeng Khunou

Salam SDC Circle

Sekmai SDC Circle

Patsoi subdivision

Patsoi SDC Circle 

The following villages are not listed in the 2011 census directory:

 Lamjao Thongba
 Langjing

Konthoujam SDC Circle 

The following villages are not listed in the 2011 census directory:

 Thangtek
 Awang Phoijing
 Kha Jiri

Wangoi subdivision

Hiyangthang SDC Circle

Lilong Chajing SDC Circle 

The following villages are not listed in the 2011 census directory:

 Naorem Leikai
 Langthabal Kunja
 Chajing (Part-1)
 Chajing (Part-2)
 Karam
 Haoreibi
 Naran konjil

Mayang Imphal SDC Circle 

The following villages are not listed in the 2011 census directory:

 Bangoon
 Mayang Imphal
 Kokchai
 Chabung Company
 Chirai

Wangoi SDC Circle 

The following villages are not listed in the 2011 census directory:

 Mutum Phibou
 Laiphrakpam
 Lakhuhuidrom
 Wangoi Top
 Thiyam Leisangkhong
 Wangoi (village)
 Oinam Sawombung
 Naorem Chaphrou
 Samurou (village)
 Heiningsoi

References 

Imphal West